Alucita melanodactyla is a species of moth of the family Alucitidae. It is known from the Seychelles.

References

Alucitidae
Moths of Seychelles
Moths described in 1966